Muhamad Kaironnisam Sahabudin Hussain (born 10 May 1979 in Mergong) is a Malaysian former footballer. He played as a defender.

He previously played for Perlis FA during 2003 until 2005. During 2004 season, he help Perlis to clinch their first Malaysia Cup title after 83 years trying to win it. After the Malaysia Cup success, he stayed with the Northern Lions and helped Perlis FA to win the Malaysia Super League. He also helped Perlis FA to become Malaysia Cup runners-up to Selangor FA. He also played for UPB-MyTeam, Johor FC and Felda United during his club career.

With Malaysia, Kaironnisam has represented the national team since Allan Harris era. With his partner Norhafiz Zamani Misbah they are very well known in Malaysian football and always being partnered in an international matches. He has played in two Asian Games with Malaysia and three ASEAN Football Championship, and also captaining Malaysia in the 2007 AFC Asian Cup. He is also one of the players who earned silver medal in 2001 Southeast Asian Games.

His son, Firdaus Kaironnisam has played for the Malaysia national under-16 football team.

International goals

References

External links
 Player profile at doha-2006.com
 

1979 births
Living people
Malaysian people of Malay descent
Malaysian footballers
Malaysia international footballers
2007 AFC Asian Cup players
People from Kedah
Perlis FA players
Felda United F.C. players
Johor Darul Ta'zim F.C. players
Malaysia Super League players
Association football defenders
Footballers at the 2002 Asian Games
Footballers at the 2006 Asian Games
Asian Games competitors for Malaysia